The flag of Yerevan shows Yerevan's arms surrounded by 12 triangles, symbolizing 12 past capitals of Armenia on a white background, symbolizing clearness and simplicity. The colors used in the flag are the same as in the flag of Armenia, representing the importance of Yerevan as capital.

The flag's final design was approved on September 27, 2004.

See also
 Flag of Armenia
 List of Armenian flags
 List of city flags in Europe

References

Flags of cities
Flag
Yerevan
Flags introduced in 2004
Flags displaying animals